Jesu may refer to:

Jesus (c. 4 BC – c. AD 30/33), Jewish religious leader and central figure of Christianity
Jesu (name), vocative and poetic form of Jesus' name

Music
Jesu (band), a British experimental band formed by Justin Broadrick
Jesu (album), a 2004 album by the band Jesu
"Jesu, Joy of Man's Desiring", final movement of Johann Sebastian Bach's Herz und Mund und Tat und Leben, BWV 147
Jesu, der du meine Seele, BWV 78, cantata by Bach
"Jesu, meine Freude", hymn by Johann Franck
Jesu, nun sei gepreiset, BWV 41, cantata by Bach
Jesu, meine Freude, BWV 227, motet by Bach

See also

Jesus (disambiguation)